Ferdynand Antoni Ossendowski (27 May 1876 – 3 January 1945) was a Polish writer, explorer, university professor, and anticommunist political activist. He is known for his books about Lenin and the Russian Civil War in which he participated.

Early years
He was born on 27 May 1876, on his family's manor near Ludza in the Vitebsk Governorate (now Latvia). His family was of Lipka Tatar descent. He studied at the famous gymnasium in Kamieniec Podolski, but he moved with his father, a renowned doctor, to Saint Petersburg, where he graduated from a Russian language school. Then he joined the mathematical-physical faculty of the local university, where he studied chemistry. As an assistant to professor Aleksander Zalewski, he traveled to many distant areas, including Siberia, the Caucasus and the Altay Mountains. During the summer, he was frequently enrolled as a ship's writer on the Odessa-Vladivostok line, a job that allowed him to visit many parts of Asia, including Japan, Sumatra, China, Malaya and Indonesia. For his description of his trip to Crimea and Constantinople, he received his first royalty. His record of a trip to India (Chmura nad Gangesem: A Cloud Over the Ganges) gained the prestigious Petersburg Society of Literature prize.

In 1899, after a students' riot in Saint Petersburg, Ossendowski was forced to leave Imperial Russia and move to Paris, where he continued his studies at the Sorbonne, his professors being Maria Curie-Skłodowska and Marcelin Berthelot. It is possible that he received a doctorate back in Russia, but no documents have survived. In 1901 he was allowed to return to Russia, where professor Zalewski invited him to the newly founded Institute of Technology of the Tomsk State University. There, he gave lectures on chemistry and physics. At the same time he also gave lectures at the Agricultural Academy and published numerous scientific works on hydrology, geology, physical chemistry, geography and physics.

After the outbreak of the Russo-Japanese War (1904–1905) Ossendowski moved to Harbin in Manchuria, where he founded a Central Technical Research Laboratory, a Russian-financed institution for development of the ore deposits in the area. At the same time, he headed the local branch of the Russian Geographic Society in Vladivostok. As such he made numerous trips to Korea, Sakhalin, Ussuri and the shores of the Bering Strait. In Manchuria, he also became one of the leaders of the considerable Polish diaspora and published his first novel in Polish, Noc (Night). He also got involved in the Main Revolutionary Committee, a leftist organisation that tried to take power in Manchuria during the Revolution of 1905. After the failure of the revolution, Ossendowski organised a strike against the brutal repressions in Congress Poland for which he was arrested. A military tribunal sentenced him to death for conspiracy against the tsar, but his sentence was later commuted to several years' hard labour.

St. Petersburg to China

In 1907, he was released from prison with a so-called wolf ticket, which prevented him from finding a job or leaving Russia. At that time he devoted himself to writing. His novel V ludskoi pyli (In Human Dust), in which he described his several years' stay in Russian prisons, gained him much popularity in Russia and was even described by Leo Tolstoy as one of his favorites. His popularity allowed him to return to St Petersburg in 1908. There he continued to write books and at the same time headed the Society of the Gold and Platinum Industry and several newspapers and journals, both in Russian and in Polish. After the outbreak of World War I, Ossendowski published several more books, including a science fiction novel, a propaganda novel on German spies in Russia and a brochure describing German and Austro-Hungarian war crimes.

After the outbreak of the February Revolution of 1917, Ossendowski moved yet again, to Siberia, this time to Omsk, where he started giving lectures at the local university. After the October Revolution and the outbreak of the Russian Civil War, he also got involved in the counterrevolutionary Russian government led by Supreme Governor Admiral Aleksandr Kolchak. He served at various posts, among others as an intelligence officer, an envoy to the intervention corps from the United States and an assistant to the Polish 5th Rifle Division of Maj. Walerian Czuma. In 1918 he was responsible for the transfer of many tsarist and White Russian documents to the Entente, including proofs (many apparently forged) of German support (confirmed later from German archives) for Lenin and his Bolsheviks (so-called Sisson Documents).

After Kolchak's defeat in 1920, Ossendowski joined a group of Poles and White Russians trying to escape from communist-controlled Siberia to India through Mongolia, China and Tibet. After a journey of several thousand miles, the group reached Chinese-controlled Mongolia, only to be stopped there by the takeover of the country led by mysterious Baron Roman Ungern von Sternberg. The Baron was a mystic who was fascinated by the beliefs and religions of the Far East such as Buddhism and "who believed himself to be a reincarnation of Kangchendzönga, the Mongolian god of war." Ungern-Sternberg's philosophy was an exceptionally muddled mixture of Russian nationalism with Chinese and Mongol beliefs. However, he also proved to be an exceptional military commander, and his forces grew rapidly.

Ossendowski joined the baron's army as a commanding officer of one of the self-defense troops. He also briefly became Ungern's political advisor and chief of intelligence. Little is known of his service at the latter post, which adds to Ossendowski's legend as a mysterious person. In late 1920, he was sent with a diplomatic mission to Japan and then the US, never to return to Mongolia. Some writers believe that Ossendowski was one of the people who hid the semimythical treasures of Baron Roman von Ungern-Sternberg.

After his arrival in New York City, Ossendowski started to work for the Polish diplomatic service and possibly as a spy. At the same time, in late 1921 he published his first book in English: Beasts, Men and Gods. The description of his travels during the Russian Civil War and the campaigns led by the Bloody Baron became a striking success and a bestseller. In 1923, it was translated into Polish and then into several other languages.

Back to Poland
In 1922, Ossendowski returned to Poland and settled in Warsaw. Immediately upon his return, he started giving lectures at the Wolna Wszechnica Polska, Higher War School and School of Political Sciences at the Warsaw University. At the same time, he remained an advisor to the Polish government and an expert sovietologist.

He continued to travel to different parts of the world, and after each journey he published a book or two. In the interwar period, he was considered the creator of a distinct genre called the traveling novel. With over 70 books published in Poland and translated almost 150 times into 20 other languages, Ossendowski was also the second most popular Polish author abroad, after Henryk Sienkiewicz. He repeated the success of his Beasts, Men and Gods with a book on Lenin in which he openly criticized Soviet communist methods and policies as well as the double face of the communist leaders. In Poland, three of his books were being filmed at the moment World War II started.

World War II

After the 1939 Invasion of Poland and the outbreak of World War II, Ossendowski remained in Warsaw, where he lived at 27 Grójecka Street. In 1942 he converted to Catholicism (previously being a Lutheran), and the following year, he joined the ranks of the underground National Party. He worked in the structures of the Polish Secret State and cooperated with the Government Delegate's Office in preparation of the underground education in Poland during World War II and postwar learning programmes.

After the Warsaw Uprising, Ossendowski, now seriously ill, moved to the village of Żółwin, near the Warsaw suburb of Milanówek. On 2 January 1945, he was taken to the hospital in Grodzisk Mazowiecki where he died on 3 January 1945. He was buried the following day in the local cemetery in Milanówek.

Aftermath
Two weeks after Ossendowski's death, on 18 January, the area was seized by the Red Army. It turned out that Ossendowski was being sought by the NKVD, and was being considered an enemy of the people for his book on Lenin and the Soviet system, which was considered an act of anti-Soviet agitation. The Soviet agents exhumed his body to confirm his identity and that he was really dead.

After the war, the new communist Soviet-led authorities of Poland issued a ban on all books by Ossendowski. Many of his books were confiscated from the libraries and burnt. It was not until 1989 that his books were again published openly in Poland.

Bibliography
The relative obscurity of much of Ossendowski's output means that many books have been published twice under different names or with no date of publication. The following list is an approximate and incomplete bibliography only.

 "Chmura nad Gangesem: A Cloud Over the Ganges"
 "Noc" (Night)
 "V ludskoi pyli" (In Human Dust)
  – 1922
 Black Magic of Mongolia – 1922 
 "With Baron Ungern in Urga" – 1922 
  – 1923
 From President to Prison – 1925
 – 1925
  – 1926
 The Breath of The Desert: Oasis and Simoon: The Account of a Journey Through Algeria and Tunisia – 1927
 Slaves of the Sun: Travels in West Africa – 1928
 Life Story of a Little Monkey: The Diary of the Chimpanzee Ket – 1930
  – 1931
 Noc – Władywostok 1905
 W ludzkim pyle
 Cień ponurego Wschodu: za kulisami życia rosyjskiego – Warszawa 1923, Warszawa 1990
 W ludzkiej i leśnej kniei – Warszawa 1923
 Zwierzęta, ludzie, bogowie lub Przez kraj ludzi, zwierząt i bogów. Konno przez Azję Centralną – Warszawa 1923, Poznań 1927, repr. Białystok 1991, .
 Cud bogini Kwan-Non: z życia Japonji – Poznań 1924
 Najwyższy lot – "Książki ciekawe", Warszawa 1923; Wydawnictwo Polskie R. Wegnera, Poznań 1929 (wydanie II), 1935 (wydanie III); reprint: Wydawnictwo LTW, Łomianki 2011, 
 Nieznanym szlakiem: nowele – Poznań 1924,.
 Za Chińskim Murem – Warszawa 1924
 Od szczytu do otchłani: wspomnienia i szkice – Warszawa 1925
 Orlica – Bibl. Dzieł Wyborowych, Warszawa 1925; kolejne wydania: Wydawnictwo Polskie R. Wegnera, Poznań 1928, 1929, 1930, 1932, Norymberga 1948; reprint: Iskry, Warszawa 1957
 Po szerokim świecie – Warszawa 1925
 Toreador w masce i inne opowieści – Poznań 1925
 Zbuntowane i zwyciężone – Warszawa 1925
 Czarny czarownik: relacja z wyprawy do Afryki – Warszawa 1926
 Płomienna Północ – Wydawnictwo Polskie, Lwów 1926, 1927
 Pod smaganiem samumu. Podróż po Afryce Północnej. Algierja i Tunisja – Wydawnictwo Polskie, Poznań 1926, Lwów 1927
 Huragan – Warszawa 1927
 Niewolnicy słońca: podróż przez zachodnią połać Afryki podzwrotnikowej w l. 1925/26 r. – Wydawnictwo Polskie R. Wegnera, Poznań 1927, 1928
 Wśród Czarnych – Lwów 1927
 Na skrzyżowaniu dróg: nowele i szkice – Tczew 1928
 Pięć minut po północy – Wydawnictwo Polskie R. Wegnera, Poznań 1928
 Pod polską banderą – Lwów 1928
 Sokół pustyni – Poznań 1928 – na jej podstawie nakręcono film kinowy Głos pustyni (1932)
 Szkarłatny kwiat kamelii – Poznań 1928
 Wańko z Lisowa – Lwów 1928
 Życie i przygody małpki – Lwów 1928
 Krwawy generał – Wydawnictwo Polskie (R. Wegner), Poznań 1929; reprint: Agencja Wydawnicza "BS", Warszawa 1990
 Lisowczycy: powieść historyczna – Wydawnictwo Polskie R. Wegnera, Poznań 1929; reprint: Libra, Warszawa 1990
 Męczeńska włóczęga – Wydawnictwo Polskie (R. Wegner), Poznań 1929; reprinty: "Słowo", Warszawa 1986, Agencja Wydawnicza "BS", Warszawa 1990
 Przez kraj szatana – Wydawnictwo Polskie (R. Wegner), Poznań 1929; reprint: Agencja Wydawnicza "BS", Warszawa 1990
 Lenin – Wydawnictwo Polskie R. Wegnera, Poznań 1930 (3 wydania), liczne tłumaczenia, reprinty: Wydawnictwo Alfa, 1990, Wydawnictwo Maj, 1990, Wydawnictwo LTW 2011, 
 Mali zwycięzcy: przygody dzieci w pustyni Szamo – Lwów 1930, Warszawa 1991, repr. Gdańsk [1991]
 Miljoner „Y”: powieść o dzielnym Murzynku-sierocie – Warszawa [ok. 1930]
 Nieznanym szlakiem – Wydawnictwo Polskie R. Wegnera, Poznań 1930
 Czao-Ra – Warszawa 1931
 Gasnące ognie: podróż po Palestynie, Syrji, Mezopotamji – Wydawnictwo Polskie R. Wegnera, Poznań 1931
 Trębacz cesarski – Miejsce piastowe [1930]
 Zagończyk – Lwów 1931
 Zwierzyniec – Wydawnictwo Polskie R. Wegnera, Poznań 1931
 Okręty zbłąkane – Kraków 1932
 Syn Beliry – Warszawa 1932, następne wydania pt. Tajemnica płonącego samolotu
 Daleka podróż boćka – Warszawa 1932
 Narodziny Lalki – Warszawa 1932
 Przygody Jurka w Afryce – Warszawa 1932
 Słoń Birara – Kraków 1932, Warszawa 1958 i 1990, a także ok. 2006 jako szósty tom kolekcji „Cała Polska Czyta Dzieciom”
 Staś emigrant – Warszawa 1932
 W krainie niedźwiedzi – Warszawa 1932
 Afryka, kraj i ludzie – Warszawa 1934
 Polesie – Wydawnictwo Polskie R. Wegnera, seria Cuda Polski, Poznań 1934
 Pożółkły list – Warszawa 1934
 Mocni ludzie – Lwów, Warszawa [1935], Wrocław, Warszawa [ok. 1946]
 Nauczycielka – Poznań 1935
 Skarb Wysp Andamańskich – Warszawa 1935
 Tajemnica płonącego samolotu – Warszawa 1935, pierwsze wydanie z 1932 jako Syn Beliry
 W polskiej dżungli – Warszawa 1935
 Aldo – Wydawnictwo Polskie R. Wegnera, Poznań 1936
 Bajeczki niebajeczki – Częstochowa 1936
 Czarnoskórka – Wydawnictwo Polskie R. Wegnera, Poznań 1936
 Dimbo – Wydawnictwo Polskie R. Wegnera, Poznań 1936
 Drobnoludki i inne dziwy – Częstochowa 1936
 Grzmot – Wydawnictwo Polskie R. Wegnera, Poznań 1936
 Huculszczyzna: Gorgany i Czarnohora – Wydawnictwo Polskie R. Wegnera, seria Cuda Polski, Poznań 1936; reprint Zakład Narodowy im. Ossolińskich, Wrocław 1990, 
 Iskry spod młota – Poznań 1936
 Kosmacz – Wydawnictwo Polskie R. Wegnera, Poznań 1936
 Kraczka – Wydawnictwo Polskie R. Wegnera, Poznań 1936
 Kruszenie kamienia – Wydawnictwo Polskie R. Wegnera, Poznań 1936
 Miś i Chocha – Wydawnictwo Polskie R. Wegnera, Poznań 1936
 Ogień wykrzesany – Wydawnictwo Polskie R. Wegnera, Poznań 1936
 Popielatka – Wydawnictwo Polskie R. Wegnera, Poznań 1936
 Puszcze polskie – Wydawnictwo Polskie R. Wegnera, seria Cuda Polski, Poznań 1936; Wydawnictwo Tern (Rybitwa) Book, Londyn 1953; reprint: Sejneńskie Towarzystwo Opieki Nad Zabytkami, 2008, 
 Rudy zbój – Wydawnictwo Polskie R. Wegnera, Poznań 1936
 Szympansiczka – Wydawnictwo Polskie R. Wegnera, Poznań 1936
 W krainie niedźwiedzi – Warszawa, 1932 i wydania kolejne, 1935–1939
 Młode wino – Warszawa 1937
 Postrach gór – Warszawa 1937
 Szanchaj – Wydawnictwo Polskie R. Wegnera, Poznań 1937
 Biesy – Poznań 1938
 Orły podkarpackie – Przemyśl 1938
 Pierścień z krwawnikiem – Kraków 1938
 Pod sztandarami Sobieskiego – Warszawa 1938
 Zygzaki – Poznań 1938
 Biały kapitan – Wydawnictwo Polskie R. Wegnera, Poznań 1939; reprint Oficyna Cracovia Kraków 1990
 Cztery cuda Polski – Warszawa 1939
 Karpaty i Podkarpacie – Wydawnictwo Polskie R. Wegnera, seria Cuda Polski, Poznań 1928, 1939; reprint Libra, 
 Jasnooki łowca – Kraków 1946
 Wacek i jego Pies – Poznań 1947
 Dzieje burzliwego okresu (od szczytu do otchłani) – Wydawnictwo Polskie (R. Wegner), Poznań [ok. 1934]
 Cadyk ben Beroki – Białystok 1992, .

See also
 Sławomir Rawicz
 Tiziano Terzani
 Roman von Ungern-Sternberg
 Polish-Mongolian literary relations

References

External links
 
 
 
 Beasts, Men and Gods at Google Books
 

1876 births
1945 deaths
People from Ludza
People from Lyutsinsky Uyezd
Polish nobility
Clan of Lis
Polish people of Lipka Tatar descent
Polish Lutherans
Polish Roman Catholics
Converts to Roman Catholicism from Lutheranism
National Party (Poland) politicians
Polish anthropologists
Polish anti-communists
Polish biochemists
Polish biologists
Polish cartographers
20th-century Polish chemists
Polish ethnographers
Polish explorers
Polish geodesists
20th-century Polish geologists
Polish hydrotechnicians
Polish journalists
Linguists from Poland
Polish mineralogists
20th-century Polish novelists
Polish male novelists
Polish physical chemists
20th-century Polish physicists
Polish social scientists
Polish travel writers
19th-century male writers
Academic staff of Tomsk State University
People of the Russian Civil War
Polish resistance members of World War II
Golden Laurel of the Polish Academy of Literature
People from the Russian Empire of Lipka Tatar descent